{{Infobox radio station
| name             = WLHZ-LP
| logo             = WLHZ-LP logo.png
| logo_size        = 230px
| city             = Springfield, Massachusetts
| area             =
| branding         = UncionFM 107.9
| airdate          = 
| frequency        = 107.9 MHz
| format           = Spanish Religious
| erp              = 7 watts
| haat             = 112 meters (367 feet)
| class            = L1
| facility_id      = 134242
| coordinates      = 
| callsign_meaning = ''La Hora Zero (Zero Hour in Spanish)
| former_callsigns = 
| owner            = Pentecostal Church Refuge Of Salvation
| licensee         = La Hora Ministerio
| sister_stations  = 
| webcast          = Listen Live
| website          = http://www.uncionfm.com/
| affiliations     =  
}}WLHZ-LP''' (107.9 FM, "UncionFM 107.9") is a radio station licensed to serve Springfield, Massachusetts.  The station is owned by Pentecostal Church Refuge Of Salvation. It airs a Spanish-language religious radio format.

The station was assigned the WLHZ-LP call letters by the Federal Communications Commission on February 11, 2008.

Another Spanish-language religious station, WREA-LP in Holyoke, had also been assigned to WLHZ-LP's original 104.9 MHz frequency but in March 2008 WLHZ-LP received a construction permit from the FCC to relocate to 107.9 MHz to avoid interference with WREA-LP.

WLHZ-LP currently transmits from the AT&T mobility tower on East Mountain in Westfield. WLHZ-LP applied to change frequency to 98.7 on February 29, 2012, to alleviate interference issues from "(a) first adjacent FM station".

References

External links
WLHZ-LP official website
 

LHZ-LP
LHZ-LP
Mass media in Springfield, Massachusetts
Radio stations established in 2008
LHZ-LP
2008 establishments in Massachusetts